An Advanced Individual Training (AIT) Platoon Sergeant is a United States Army Non-Commissioned Officer (NCO) responsible for the health, welfare, mentoring, disciplining, physical fitness and Warrior-Task training of AIT Soldiers. NCOs in the enlisted grade of E6 or E7 are assigned as AIT Platoon Sergeants and incur a minimum 24-month tour of duty. The size of the AIT Platoon varies by installation and can range from 20 to 120 Soldiers, though TRADOC Regulation 350-37 states the desired ratio is one Platoon Sergeant to 40 Soldiers. An average AIT Company has between two and five Platoons. "The Army’s Human Resources Command may involuntarily select NCOs or NCOs may volunteer for AIT Platoon Sergeant Duty". AIT Platoon Sergeants are typically assigned to TRADOC locations that reflect their present Career Management Field (CMF), but can be sent to other installations if needed.

History

On July 31, 2007, the role of the Advanced Individual Training (AIT) Platoon Sergeant was initiated. Prior to this, Drill Sergeants were responsible for managing AIT Soldiers. The Army replaced AIT Drill Sergeants as a way of allowing AIT Instructors to serve in leadership roles as Squad Leaders, further enabling the Platoon Sergeant to manage the Platoon in the same manner he or she would in a line unit. It also allowed Soldiers to feel more comfortable addressing both personal and professional issues with the Platoon Sergeant. The intimidating leadership style of Army Drill Sergeants seemed better suited for developing new recruits in Basic Training. AIT Platoon Sergeants do not wear the signature campaign hat that their predecessor Drill Sergeants wore before them. "Pilot programs for the position were tested at Fort Lee, VA; Fort Bliss, TX; and Fort Jackson, SC."

School

The AIT Platoon Sergeant course is a six-week school taught at Fort Jackson, SC. NCOs are trained on the following course modules:
 Applying TRADOC's Training Guidance & Investment Strategy
 Effectively Educate and Train as IET Leaders
 Enforce Wellness and Fitness in AIT
 Demonstrate Competency in Warrior Tasks and Battle Drills
 Lead squad /platoon size elements in AIT
 Manage and mitigate risks by using the Composite Risk Management
 Differentiate IET components and utilize support systems in producing quality Soldiers

Candidates are assigned the Skill Qualification Identifier of 'Y' upon successful completion of the course

References

United States Army job titles